Shaik Rasheed (born 24 September 2004) is an Indian cricketer. He made his first class debut on 24 February 2022, for Andhra Pradesh against Services in the 2021–22 Ranji Trophy. He made his T20 debut on 16 October 2022, for Andhra Pradesh against Nagaland in the 2022–23 Syed Mushtaq Ali Trophy. 

He was also named as vice-captain in the India's squad for the 2022 Under-19 Cricket World Cup. His contributions with bat especially in both semi-final and final helped India win the U-19 World Cup.

References

External links
 

2004 births
Living people
Indian cricketers
Hyderabad cricketers
Place of birth missing (living people)